The voiced palatal affricate is a type of consonantal sound, used in some spoken languages. The tie bar may be omitted, yielding  in the IPA and J\j\ in X-SAMPA.

This sound is the non-sibilant equivalent of the voiced alveolo-palatal affricate.

It occurs in languages such as Albanian, and Skolt Sami, among others. The voiced palatal affricate is quite rare; it is mostly absent from Europe as a phoneme (it occurs as an allophone in most Spanish dialects), with the aforementioned Uralic languages and Albanian being exceptions. It usually occurs with its voiceless counterpart, the voiceless palatal affricate.

Features
Features of the voiced palatal affricate:

 It is not a sibilant.

Occurrence

See also
Index of phonetics articles

Notes

References

External links
 

Palatal consonants
Affricates
Pulmonic consonants
Voiced oral consonants
Central consonants